The 2021 Tokyo Yakult Swallows season is the 71st season of the franchise of Nippon Professional Baseball, their 57th season at Meiji Jingu Stadium, and their 51st season under Yakult Honsha. This was also the Swallows' second season under Shingo Takatsu. This is also Takatsu's first season managing a full 143-game season, as the COVID-19 pandemic lowered the games in 2020 to 120 games. For the first time since 2015, the Swallows made the Japan Series, and won their first since 2001 against the Orix Buffaloes.

Regular season 
The Swallows, also like the Buffaloes in Pacific League, won the Central League pennant after having a last-place finish last year. They finished the season with a 73–52–18 record at a .584 winning percentage, the best in the NPB in 2021.

References

Tokyo Yakult Swallows seasons
2021 Nippon Professional Baseball season
Japan Series champion seasons